John V Lisle (c. 1386 – 17 February 1429), of Wootton, Isle of Wight was a Member of Parliament for Hampshire in 1417 and 1422. The son and heir of Sir John IV Lisle, he was the father of Sir John VI Lisle.

References

1386 births
1429 deaths
Politicians from the Isle of Wight
15th-century English people
English MPs 1417
English MPs 1422